B-Sides and Other Things I Forgot is a compilation album by American multi-genre project Blue Stahli, released on May 7, 2013. The album is composed of cover songs, outtakes from Blue Stahli's Antisleep album series, and alternate versions of previously recorded songs.

Track listing

References

2011 albums
Blue Stahli albums